Anna Ntountounaki (born 9 September 1995) is a Greek swimmer, competing for Panathinaikos on club level.

She competed in the women's 100 metre butterfly event at the 2016 Summer Olympics. She finished 17th in the heats with a time of 58.27 seconds which was a new national record. She did not qualify for the semifinals. At the 2020 Summer Olympics she finished 9th, achieving a new national record with a time of 57.25 seconds. Also, she won the gold of 2020 European Aquatics Championships sharing this title with Marie Wattel.

Education
Anna began swimming in 2002, at the age of seven. She also studied at the Queen Mary University of London.

Awards
On 24 December 2019, Ntountounaki was awarded by the mayor of Chania, Panagiotis Simandirakis, along with Stelios Michailakis.

References

External links
 

1995 births
Living people
Greek female swimmers
Olympic swimmers of Greece
Panathinaikos swimmers
Swimmers at the 2016 Summer Olympics
Sportspeople from Chania
Mediterranean Games gold medalists for Greece
Mediterranean Games silver medalists for Greece
Mediterranean Games bronze medalists for Greece
Mediterranean Games medalists in swimming
Swimmers at the 2018 Mediterranean Games
Swimmers at the 2022 Mediterranean Games
Greek female butterfly swimmers
European Aquatics Championships medalists in swimming
Swimmers at the 2020 Summer Olympics
20th-century Greek women
21st-century Greek women